Donald Alvin Buford (born February 2, 1937) is an American former professional baseball player scout, coach and manager. He played in Major League Baseball as an outfielder from  through , most notably as the leadoff hitter for the Baltimore Orioles dynasty that won three consecutive American League pennants from 1969 to 1971 and, won the World Series in 1970. He also played for the Chicago White Sox and played in the Nippon Professional Baseball league from 1973 to 1976. Buford also played as an infielder and was a switch hitter who threw right-handed. In 1993, Buford was inducted into the Baltimore Orioles Hall of Fame.

College career
Buford was born in Linden, Texas and raised in Los Angeles, California. After graduating from Susan Miller Dorsey High School, he played college baseball for the USC Trojans baseball team under legendary coach Rod Dedeaux. In 1958, he played on the Trojans' College World Series championship team with Ron Fairly and future baseball executive Pat Gillick. Buford was also a running back on the USC football team. His sons Don Buford, Jr. and Damon Buford also played for the USC Trojans. Buford is a member of Kappa Alpha Psi fraternity.

Professional career
In his major league career, Buford batted .264 with 93 home runs, 418 RBIs, 718 runs scored and 200 stolen bases in 1286 games played. Primarily a leadoff hitter, he grounded into only 34 double plays during his big-league career (4553 at bats) and holds the Major League Record for the lowest GIDP rate, averaging one in every 138 at bats.  His career total is two fewer than Jim Rice's single-season record of 36, set in 1984, and 316 fewer than Cal Ripken's career record mark of 350 GIDP's. Note: A leadoff hitter faces less double play situations, but Buford did not lead off every game in his career.

Chicago White Sox
He broke into the majors as an infielder who played both second base and third base, becoming the White Sox’ regular at the former position in 1965 (after sharing the position with Al Weis in 1964) and the latter in 1966. In the latter year, he stole a career-high 51 bases (one fewer than the American League leader, Bert Campaneris) and led the AL in sacrifice hits with 17, while establishing himself as one of the league's top leadoff hitters.

In 1967 Buford and Ken Berry tied for the team lead with a .241 batting average on a White Sox team that battled the Boston Red Sox, Detroit Tigers and Minnesota Twins for the American League pennant, which the Red Sox won on the final day of the regular season. The White Sox were eliminated from pennant contention (perhaps due, in large part, to faulty offense; they led the Majors with a 2.45 earned run average, but batted only .225) in the final week of the season after losing a doubleheader to the lowly Kansas City Athletics on September 27.

Baltimore Orioles
Buford was traded along with Bruce Howard and Roger Nelson to the Baltimore Orioles for Luis Aparicio, Russ Snyder and John Matias on November 29, 1967. In 1968 he batted .282 with 15 home runs in a lineup that also featured the likes of Frank Robinson, Brooks Robinson, Boog Powell, Davey Johnson and Paul Blair. In 1969 Buford hit a career-high .291 as the Orioles won the American League pennant. In the first game of the World Series against the New York Mets, Buford hit a leadoff home run against fellow ex-USC Trojan Tom Seaver—the first home run to lead off a World Series. (Dustin Pedroia and Alcides Escobar are the only other players to lead off a World Series with a home run, for the Boston Red Sox in 2007 and the Kansas City Royals in 2015, respectively.) Buford also drove in another run with a double as the Orioles won 4-1. However, he went 0-for-16 over the next four games, all won by the Mets for a seemingly impossible Series victory.

In 1970 Buford batted .272 with 17 home runs and a career high 109 walks. The Orioles gained redemption in the World Series, which they won over the Cincinnati Reds in five games. Buford, playing in four of those games, went 4-for-15, including a home run in Game Three, which Baltimore won 9-3. In 1971 Buford batted .290 with a career-high 19 home runs. He was also selected to the All-Star team for the only time in his career. Again the Orioles went to the World Series; this time, however, the Pittsburgh Pirates defeated them in seven games. Buford collected six hits in this Series; two of them were home runs.

In each of the Orioles’ three pennant-winning seasons Buford scored 99 runs, leading the American League in that category in 1971.  Buford was the first Baltimore Oriole to homer from both sides of the plate in the same game. He accomplished this feat on April 9, 1970 in a 13-1 win over the Cleveland Indians.  Buford also had the dubious distinction of being the first Oriole to strike out five times in one game, on August 26, 1971. However, his Orioles defeated his former team, the Chicago White Sox, 8–7.

Japan
After the 1971 season the Orioles played an exhibition series in Japan. After slumping to .206 in 1972 Buford returned to Japan, where he had been known as "The Greatest Leadoff Man in the World" during the Orioles’ tour, to play professionally. In four seasons, from 1973 to 1976, he hit .270 with 65 home runs and 213 RBI.
In 1973 and 1974 voted to top 9 Best Players in Japan. Played in All-Star Games receiving Honors.

Post retirement
In 2006, Buford was the manager of the Daytona Cubs of the Florida State League. He had also served on Frank Robinson's coaching staff with the Orioles, San Francisco Giants and Washington Nationals. Previously, he had front office and other minor league positions with the Orioles. Managed Rookie League Team (Bluefield). Managed A (Aberdeen, MD), managed high A (Frederick, MD), managed AA (Bowie), assistant farm director, farm director, all for the Orioles.

Buford's son Damon Buford also played in the major leagues, playing with the Orioles, Mets, Texas Rangers, Boston Red Sox and Chicago Cubs from 1993 to 2001. Buford's oldest son Don Buford, Jr. also played professional baseball in the Baltimore Orioles organization for four years. He is now an internationally recognized orthopedic surgeon specializing in sports medicine and shoulder surgery. Buford remains one of the most respected individuals to teach the game of baseball.  His number 9 was retired by the Daytona Cubs after the 2006 season.

In October, 2012 Don Buford, Sr. accepted a new position managing Major League Baseball's Urban Youth Academy in Compton, California. The academy focuses on baseball and softball training and education and is free to participants. He is now working on his own Community Organization, Educational Sports Institute which is based in Watts.
In 2008, Buford was inducted into the International League Triple A Hall of Fame.
In 2001, Buford was inducted into the USC Athletic Hall of Fame.
In 1993, Buford was inducted into the Baltimore Orioles Hall of Fame.

See also
List of Major League Baseball annual runs scored leaders

References

External links
, or SABR Biography Project, or Retrosheet

1937 births
Living people
African-American baseball coaches
African-American baseball players
American expatriate baseball players in Japan
American League All-Stars
Baltimore Orioles coaches
Baltimore Orioles executives
Baltimore Orioles players
Baseball players from Texas
Charleston White Sox players
Chicago White Sox players
Indianapolis Indians players
International League MVP award winners
Lincoln Chiefs players
Lynchburg White Sox players
Major League Baseball bench coaches
Major League Baseball farm directors
Major League Baseball first base coaches
Major League Baseball infielders
Major League Baseball left fielders
Milwaukee Brewers scouts
Minor league baseball managers
Nankai Hawks players
People from Linden, Texas
Rapiños de Occidente players
San Diego Padres (minor league) players
San Francisco Giants coaches
Savannah White Sox players
Baseball players from Los Angeles
Taiheiyo Club Lions players
USC Trojans baseball players
USC Trojans football players
Washington Nationals coaches
Susan Miller Dorsey High School alumni
20th-century African-American sportspeople
21st-century African-American sportspeople